John Reginald "Jack" Spratt, Detective Inspector, Nursery Crime Division, Oxford and Berkshire Constabulary, Officer Number 8216. Jack Spratt is the protagonist in a series of alternate history science fiction fantasy novels by Jasper Fforde.  He was named after the character from the English nursery rhyme. As revealed in The Big Over Easy, for example, he hates eating fat, and was once married to a woman who ate nothing else (hence, she died).

Character
Spratt is an obvious satire on the general detective stereotype. Whereas famous detectives such as Sam Spade, Philip Marlowe and Sherlock Holmes have been portrayed as confident, successful, substance-abusing loners, Spratt does not have a substance abuse problem, and is happily married with five children. In addition, he is shown in the beginning of The Big Over Easy to be an experienced and accomplished police detective, but low on self-confidence, virtually incapable of securing convictions and never recognized for the ones he does make. The reason for this is that police funding is based on public approval, which is in turn influenced by the news magazine Amazing Crime Stories. This enormously popular "true crime" magazine prints glamorous police cases—usually involving noir clichés like secret societies, mafia assassins and baffling, meticulously planned murders—that are allegedly true and unedited, but actually largely fabricated. It is revealed that early on in Spratt's career, his ambitious and self-obsessed partner Friedland Chymes stole most of the credit for their greatest cases, thereby rising to the top to become one of the most popular detectives in England. Jack, being totally honest and unwilling to cater the media's demand for glamorous hero detectives, was unable or unwilling to stand up for himself; Friedland and Jack have been enemies since. However, as the story progresses it becomes clear that Jack is not only honest, but highly intelligent and a much better detective than Chymes.

Spratt is a Detective Inspector with the Reading, Berkshire "Nursery Crimes Division", with his assistant Sergeant Mary Mary (another nursery rhyme character).

History
Spratt and Mary were originally introduced into the alternate Fforde universe in the Thursday Next novel The Well of Lost Plots (2003) before taking over their own "Nursery Crimes" series:

 The Big Over Easy (2005)
 The Fourth Bear (2006)

References 

Spratt, Jack